The plasma membrane monoamine transporter (PMAT) is a low-affinity monoamine transporter protein which in humans is encoded by the SLC29A4 gene. It is known alternatively as the human equilibrative nucleoside transporter-4 (hENT4). Unlike other members of the ENT family, it is impermeable to most nucleosides, with the exception of the inhibitory neurotransmitter and ribonucleoside adenosine, which it is permeable to in a highly pH-dependent manner.

This protein is an integral membrane protein that transports the monoamine neurotransmitters (serotonin, dopamine, norepinephrine) as well as adenosine, from synaptic spaces into presynaptic neurons or neighboring glial cells. It is abundantly expressed in the human brain, heart tissue, and skeletal muscle, as well as in the kidneys. It is relatively insensitive to the high affinity inhibitors (such as SSRIs) of the SLC6A monoamine transporters (SERT, DAT, NET), as well being only weakly sensitive to the adenosine transport inhibitor, dipyridamole. Its transport of monoamines, unlike for adenosine, is pH-insensitive. At low pH, (5.5-6.5 range, as occurs under ischemic conditions) however, its transport efficiency for adenosine becomes greater than for serotonin.

It has 530 amino acid residues with 10–12 transmembrane segments, and is not homologous to other known monoamine transporters, such as the high-affinity SERT, DAT, and NET, or the low-affinity SLC22A OCT family. It was initially identified by a search of the draft human genome database by its sequence homology to ENTs (equilibrative nucleoside transporters).

Ligands

Inhibitors

No highly selective PMAT inhibitors are yet available, but a number of existing compounds have been found to act as weak inhibitors of this transporter, with the exception of decynium-22, which is more potent. These compounds include:

 Luteolin
 Cimetidine
 Decynium-22
 Dipyridamole
 Quinidine
 Quinine
 Tryptamine
 Verapamil

Substrates

 Acetylcholine (poor)
 Adenosine (at low pH)
 Dopamine
 Epinephrine
 Histamine (poor)
 Metformin (poor, pH-dependent)
 MPP+
 Norepinephrine
 Serotonin

See also 
 Extraneuronal monoamine transporter (EMT)

References 

Membrane proteins
Neurotransmitter transporters
Solute carrier family
Molecular neuroscience